Robert Arthur Lawson was born 14 September 1974 in Dunedin. He is a New Zealand cricketer who played for the Otago Volts in the Plunket Shield.

See also
 List of Otago representative cricketers

References

External links 
  from Cricinfo.

1974 births
Living people
New Zealand cricketers
Otago cricketers
South Island cricketers